The R353 is a Regional Route in South Africa that connects Leeu-Gamka with Brandvlei via Fraserburg and Williston.

Its north-eastern terminus is the R357 at Brandvlei, Northern Cape. It initially heads south, then south-east to Williston where it meets the R63. It crosses at a staggered junction, and continues south-east to Fraserburg. At Fraserburg it crosses the R356 at another staggered junction. From Fraserburg it heads south-south-east. It passes through the Nuweveld Mountains via the Teekloof Pass and then enters the Western Cape. The route ends at Leeu-Gamka at the N1.

External links
 Routes Travel Info

References

Regional Routes in the Western Cape
Regional Routes in the Northern Cape